Road 91 is a road in eastern and southern Iran. This road connects Razavi Khorasan to Kerman, Bandarabbas and Jask.

References

External links 

 Iran road map on Young Journalists Club

Roads in Iran